Emil Holm may refer to:

 Emil Holm (sport shooter) (1877–1968), Finnish sport shooter
 Emil Holm (footballer) (born 2000), Swedish footballer